Kara-Tur: The Eastern Realms is an accessory and campaign setting for the Advanced Dungeons & Dragons fantasy role-playing game.

Contents
Kara-Tur: The Eastern Realms is a supplement which details a portion of the Forgotten Realms campaign setting using Oriental Adventures, and describes Kara-Tur in light detail to leave opportunity for further development by the Dungeon Master.

Kara-Tur's cultures and peoples are fantasy analogues of medieval regions of East and Southeast Asia:
 Shou Lung: Imperial China during periods of centralized government
 T'u Lung: Historical China during eras of political disunity, e.g. the Warring States period
 Wa: Feudal Japan (Edo/Kamakura period)
 Kozakura: Japan (Feudal/Sengoku period)
 Northern Wastes: Historical Eastern Siberia
 Tabot: Tibet
 Koryo: Korea
 The Island Kingdoms: Pre-colonial civilizations of Indonesia and the Philippines.
 The Plain of Horses: Historical Mongolia. This region is the Kara-Tur portion of the Hordelands, also known as the Endless Wastes.  
 The Jungle Lands of Malatra: Pre-colonial civilizations of Indochina (historical versions of the Khmer Empire and Vietnam) as well as the hill tribes inspired by their real-life Southeast Asian counterparts.

Publication history
The fantasy setting known as Kara-Tur was described in the original 1985 Oriental Adventures book. A reviewer for White Dwarf called the long background section of Kara-Tur in the book, a "bonus". Kara-Tur is described in the "Province Book" from the 1986 Swords of the Daimyo module.  The 1987 Forgotten Realms Campaign Set left the eastern half of its continent reserved for the future publication of Kara-Tur. According to Jim Bambra, "While primarily drawing on Japan for inspiration, [Kara-Tur] also contains elements of medieval China and Korea."

Kara-Tur: The Eastern Realms was written by Mike Pondsmith, Jay Batista, Rick Swan, John Nephew and Deborah Christian, with a cover by Jeff Easley and interior illustrations by Jim Holloway, and was published by TSR in 1988 as a boxed set with two 96-page books, four large color maps, and two plastic overlays.

Shannon Appelcline noted that John Nephew had been contributing to Dragon and Dungeon, and that "As he continued to write for the magazines, he was also invited to contribute to larger projects such as Kara-Tur: The Eastern Realms (1988) and WG7: Castle Greyhawk (1988)." Appelcline also highlighted that "Kara-Tur was the first big expansion" of the Forgotten Realms that "used real-world cultures as a touchstone".

Reception
Kara-Tur: The Eastern Realms is a Gamers' Choice award-winner.

Appelcline highlighted a note from Ed Greenwood, creator of the Forgotten Realms, that the major additions to the setting with real-world correlations "also include 'recastings of my largely-offstage kingdoms like Unther and Mulhorand to more closely resemble real-world historical (or 'Hollywood historical') settings.' Greenwood disagrees with the results, saying that 'the too-close-to-our-real-world additions like Maztica, the Hordelands, and Kara-Tur were a mistake in style'. He thought that they '[pulled] gamers out of roleplaying into disputes about historical details, for one thing'."

The holder of rights Wizards of the Coast considers Kara-Tur: The Eastern Realms among such "legacy content" that "may reflect ethnic, racial, and gender prejudice that were commonplace in American society at that time", and distances itself from such prejudices.

Reviews
Kara-Tur: The Eastern Realms was reviewed in issue 16 of the German RPG-magazine ZauberZeit.

Related products

Sourcebooks

Advanced Dungeons & Dragons 2nd edition 
In 1989, a printing of Trail Maps for Kara-Tur appeared. In 1990, the maps were again included in The Forgotten Realms Atlas. Later that year, TSR converted the monsters of Kara-Tur to second edition Advanced Dungeons & Dragons rules as part of the Monstrous Compendium series.

After 1990, TSR ceased publishing new material related to Kara-Tur. The setting was, however, occasionally referred to by other TSR products such as Spelljammer and Ravenloft.

Dungeons & Dragons 3rd edition 
The setting of Kara-Tur still exists on Abeir-Toril and is often mentioned in Forgotten Realms supplements. Characters and artifacts from Kara-Tur sometimes show up in Faerûn, but beyond that there is little interaction between the continents.

Dungeons & Dragons 5th edition 
The 2015 release of Sword Coast Adventurer's Guide, a supplement, introduced Kara-Tur to the fifth edition of Dungeons & Dragons. There is a brief description of the land along with references throughout the book to its culture and how certain classes or backgrounds might fit in there.

Modules 
The Kara-Tur campaign setting inspired the following eight adventure modules (in chronological order):

 OA1, Swords of the Daimyo (1986)
 OA2, Night of the Seven Swords (1986)
 OA3, Ochimo: The Spirit Warrior (1987)
 OA4, Blood of the Yakuza (1987)
 OA5, Mad Monkey vs. the Dragon Claw (1988, zip)
 FROA1, Ninja Wars (1990)
 OA6, Ronin Challenge (1990, zip)
 OA7, Test of the Samurai (1990)

Books 
Three choose your own adventure style books (one was actually released before the original Oriental Adventures book) were published:

 Blade of the Young Samurai – Endless Quest 23 (1984)
 Test of the Ninja – AD&D Adventure Gamebook 5 (1985)
 Warlords – 1 on 1 Book 7 (1986)

One of novels in The Empires Trilogy is set in Shou Lung of Kara-Tur.

Other 

 Dragon #315, for information on ancestor feats and martial arts styles specific to the Kara-Tur setting, as well as updated information on the 10 empires and regions of Kara-Tur.

References

Dungeons & Dragons sourcebooks
Role-playing game supplements introduced in 1988